The 1834 United States elections occurred in the middle of Democratic President Andrew Jackson's second term. Members of the 24th United States Congress were chosen in this election. Taking place during the Second Party System, elections were contested between Andrew Jackson's Democratic Party and opponents of Jackson, including the remnants of the National Republican Party. During this election, the anti-Jackson faction began to transition into the Whig Party. Arkansas and Michigan joined the union during the 24th Congress. Democrats retained the majority in the House, and won control of the Senate.

In the House, the anti-Jackson faction picked up some seats from the Anti-Masonic Party, but the Democrats retained a commanding majority.

In the Senate, the Democrats picked up a moderate number of seats and gained control of the majority with the aid of Democratic Vice President Martin Van Buren, who cast the tie-breaking vote.

See also
1834–35 United States House of Representatives elections
1834–35 United States Senate elections

References

 
1834
United States midterm elections